The 2016 WFG Masters was a curling bonspiel held from October 25 to 30, at the Pason Centennial Arena in Okotoks, Alberta. This was the first Grand Slam of the 2016–17 curling season.

On the men's side, the Niklas Edin rink from Karlstad, Sweden won their first Grand Slam event, and also became the first non-Canadian team to win a men's Grand Slam event. Edin defeated the defending Olympic champion, Brad Jacobs rink from Sault Ste. Marie, Ontario. The women's final was a battle of Ontario with Caledon's Allison Flaxey upsetting the World #1 Rachel Homan rink from Ottawa to win her first ever Grand Slam event.

The total purse for both the men's and women's event was $125,000 with the winner's share being $30,000. This is the largest purse in Masters history.

Men

Teams

Round-robin standings
Final round-robin standings

Round-robin results

Draw 1
Tuesday, October 25, 7:00 pm

Draw 2
Wednesday, October 26, 09:00 am

Draw 3
Wednesday, October 26, 12:30 pm

Draw 4
Wednesday, October 26, 4:00 pm

Draw 5
Wednesday, October 26, 7:30 pm

Draw 6
Thursday, October 27, 9:00 am

Draw 7
Thursday, October 27, 12:30 pm

Draw 8
Thursday, October 27, 4:00 pm

Draw 9
Thursday, October 27, 7:30 pm

Draw 10
Friday, October 28, 9:00 am

Draw 11
Friday, October 28, 12:30 pm

Draw 12
Friday, October 28, 4:00 pm

Tiebreaker
Friday, October 28, 7:30 pm

Playoffs

Quarterfinals
Saturday, October 29, 11:00 am

Semifinals
Saturday, October 29, 7:00 pm

Final
Sunday, October 30, 11:00 am

Women

Teams

Round-robin standings
Final round-robin standings

Round-robin results

Draw 1
Tuesday, October 25, 7:00 pm

Draw 2
Wednesday, October 26, 9:00 am

Draw 3
Wednesday, October 26, 12:30 pm

Draw 4
Wednesday, October 26, 4:00 pm

Draw 5
Wednesday, October 26, 7:30 pm

Draw 6
Thursday, October 27, 9:00 am

Draw 7
Thursday, October 27, 12:30 pm

Draw 8
Thursday, October 27, 4:00 pm

Draw 9
Thursday, October 27, 7:30 pm

Draw 10
Friday, October 28, 9:00 am

Draw 11
Friday, October 28, 12:30 pm

Draw 12
Friday, October 28, 4:00 pm

Draw 13
Friday, October 28, 7:30 pm

Tiebreaker
Saturday, October 29, 9:30 am

Playoffs

Quarterfinals
Saturday, October 29, 3:00 pm

Semifinals
Saturday, October 29, 7:00 pm

Final
Sunday, October 30, 3:00 pm

References

External links
 

October 2016 sports events in Canada
2016 in Canadian curling
Okotoks
Curling in Alberta
2016 in Alberta
2016